The Chinese characters 雅樂 may refer to:

Yayue, the ancient court ritual music of China
Gagaku, the ancient court ritual music of Japan, of Chinese and Korean origin
Aak, the ancient court ritual music of Korea, of Chinese origin
Nhã nhạc, the ancient court ritual music of Vietnam, of Chinese origin